Lyre and Sword (Ger., Leyer und Schwerdt, modern spelling, Leier und Schwert) is a collection of patriotic poetry by Theodor Körner (1791-1813), which first appeared posthumously in 1814, consisting mostly of poems from the last year of his life. The poet had taken part in the German War of Liberation as a lieutenant in the Lützow Free Corps and fell on August 26, 1813 near Gadebusch. The poems, some of them based on German folk-tunes, were originally sung to the guitar or recited by the poet to his fellow soldiers.

The influence of the first volume (Vienna 1814) published by the poet's father,  Christian Gottfried Körner, was increased by numerous new editions, as well as by musical settings of various individual poems such as “Lützow's Wild Chase”, the “Cavalry Song,” and the “Sword Song”. Carl Maria von Weber used the title Lyre and Sword for a collection of four-part settings for men's chorus of several of the poems, Op. 42. Other poems such as “My Fatherland,” the “Hunters’ Song,” and “Prayer During the Battle” were set by such composers as Franz Schubert.

Quotation

References 

This article incorporates a translation from the German Wikipedia article Leyer und Schwerdt.

External links 

 Theodor Körner: Leyer und Schwerdt. Von dem Vater des Dichters veranstaltete Ausgabe. Wien, 1814.  (Lyre and Sword. Edition set forth by the Poet's Father. Vienna 1814.) (Digitalized)
 Theodor Körner: Leyer und Schwerdt. Einzige rechtmäßige, von dem Vater des Dichters veranstaltete Ausgabe. (Lyre and Sword. Fully corrected edition, set forth by the Poet's Father. Nicolai, Berlin 1814.) (Digitalisat und Volltext im Deutschen Textarchiv)
 Digitalized from an 1815 edition.
 Text at zeno.org

19th-century poems
German poetry collections
Napoleonic Wars
German music
1814 poems